R. australis  may refer to:
 Ramphotyphlops australis, a non-venomous blind snake species
 Raphia australis, the giant palm or rafia, a raffia palm species found in Mozambique and South Africa
 Remora australis, the whalesucker, a fish species found worldwide in tropical and warm waters
 Rhopalosyrphus australis, a hoverfly species in the genus Rhopalosyrphus
 Rostanga australis, a sea slug species in the genus Rostanga
 Rostratula australis, the Australian painted snipe, a medium-sized, long-billed wader species
 Rickettsia australis

See also
 Australis (disambiguation)